is a 2008 Japanese film directed by Toru Yamamoto. The film stars Toru Baba and Yūta Furukawa.

Plot 
Aki Tomita (Toru Baba), a part-timer in a convenience store, leaves on his bike for a trip. On the way, he helps a middle-aged woman named Yoshiko Yumiya (Kaoru Mizuki) to carry her bags, who then invites him to her house. At her house-cum-clock shop, he meets a young apprentice Masaya Saito (Yūta Furukawa) working there who reminds him of his childhood friend and the sad past that happened two years ago.

Cast 
 Toru Baba as Aki Tomita
 Yūta Furukawa as Masaya Saito / Yuto Yasui
 Kaoru Mizuki as Yoshiko Yumiya
 Junkichi Orimoto as Miki Yumiya
 Ryunosuke Kawai as Ryo Satomi
 Masahiro Kômoto as Store Manager 
 Katsuya Kobayashi as Yosuke Sasaki

References

External links 
 

2008 films
2000s Japanese-language films
2000s Japanese films